Raizes do Samba is a series of compilation albums of notable Brazilian musicians, mostly of the bossa nova, samba and Tropicalismo genres.

Each of the following artists have their own compilation album CD:

Luiz Ayrão
Ataulfo Alves
Adoniran Barbosa
Bebeto
Elizeth Cardoso
Dorival Caymmi
Beth Carvalho
Cartola
Cinco Crioulos
Demônios da Garoa
Gonzaguinha
Almir Guineto
Clementina de Jesus
Joao Nogueira
Dona Ivone Lara
Meirelles
Carmen Miranda
Clara Nunes
Benito di Paula
Pixinguinha
Roberto Ribeiro
Jair Rodrigues
Elza Soares
Roberto Silva
Moreira da Silva
Paulinho da Viola

References

Bossa nova albums
Compilation album series
Compilation albums by Brazilian artists
2000s compilation albums